Chorizopes mucronatus is a species of spider of the genus Chorizopes. It is known only from Sri Lanka.

See also 
 List of Araneidae species

References

Araneidae
Arthropods of Sri Lanka
Spiders of Asia
Taxa named by Eugène Simon
Spiders described in 1895